Martial Bourquin (born 23 July 1952) is a member of the Senate of France, representing the Doubs department, and he is a municipal councillor for the city of Aundincourt.  He is a member of the Socialist Party.

References
Page on the Senate website

1952 births
Living people
Convention for a Progressive Alternative politicians
Socialist Party (France) politicians
French Senators of the Fifth Republic
French Communist Party politicians
Senators of Doubs